Claude Alexandre Roques (16 September 1912 – 19 November 2003) was a French field hockey player who competed in the 1936 Summer Olympics.

He was a member of the French field hockey team, which finish fourth in the 1936 Olympic tournament. He played two matches as forward.

References

External links
Claude Roques' profile at Sports Reference.com

External links
 

1912 births
2003 deaths
French male field hockey players
Olympic field hockey players of France
Field hockey players at the 1936 Summer Olympics